is a former Japanese football player.

Playing career
Umeyama was born in Saitama on August 16, 1973. After graduating from high school, he joined Japan Football League (JFL) club NKK in 1992. Although he played many matches as right side back, the club was disbanded end of 1993 season. In 1994, he moved to JFL club Fujieda Blux (later Avispa Fukuoka). He became a regular player and the club won the champions in 1995 and was promoted to J1 League from 1996. In 1998, he moved to JFL club Tokyo Gas (later FC Tokyo). He played many matches and the club was promoted to J2 League in 1999 and J1 in 2000. However the club gained Naruyuki Naito in 2000 and Umeyama could hardly play in the match. In June 2000, he moved to Verdy Kawasaki on loan. In 2001, although he returned to FC Tokyo, he could hardly play in the match. In 2002, he moved to J2 club Shonan Bellmare. He played as regular player in 2 seasons. In 2004, he moved to Albirex Niigata. He played many matches in 3 seasons and  retired end of 2006 season.

Club statistics

References

External links

Profile at J.League 

1973 births
Living people
Association football people from Saitama Prefecture
Japanese footballers
J1 League players
J2 League players
Japan Football League (1992–1998) players
NKK SC players
Avispa Fukuoka players
FC Tokyo players
Tokyo Verdy players
Shonan Bellmare players
Albirex Niigata players
Association football defenders
Japanese sportsperson-politicians